Marta Bastianelli (born 30 April 1987) is an Italian professional racing cyclist, who currently rides for UCI Women's WorldTeam . Bastianelli won the women's road race at the 2007 UCI Road World Championships ahead of Marianne Vos and Giorgia Bronzini, and also won the equivalent race at the 2018 European Road Cycling Championships, again beating Vos.

Professional career
Born in Velletri, near Rome, Bastianelli rode for the  team from 2006 to 2008. On 5 July 2008, Bastianelli tested positive for a banned substance, the stimulant fenfluramine which can be found in dietary aids. It was found in her urine A sample during a routine doping control at the under 23 European championships held in Verbania, Italy. She was subsequently dropped from the Italian team for the 2008 Summer Olympics and handed a one-year ban by the Italian National Olympic Committee. Bastianelli appealed to the Court of Arbitration for Sport to overturn the ban, however the CAS instead extended her ban to two years after the Union Cycliste Internationale appealed, arguing that the initial ban was too lenient.

She competed at the 2020 Summer Olympics, in the road race.

Personal life
Bastianelli is married and has a daughter, born in 2014.

Major results

2004
 2nd  Road race, UCI Junior Road World Championships
2006
 1st Young rider classification Thüringen Rundfahrt der Frauen
2007
 1st  Road race, UCI Road World Championships
 2nd  Road race, UEC Under-23 European Road Championships
 3rd Durango-Durango Emakumeen Saria
 3rd GP de Plouay – Bretagne
 8th Overall Emakumeen Bira
 8th Tour of Flanders for Women
2008
 2nd La Flèche Wallonne Féminine
3rd  Road race, UEC Under-23 European Road Championships
 3rd Giro del Lago Maggiore
 6th Road race, National Road Championships
 8th Trofeo Alfredo Binda-Comune di Cittiglio
 8th Tour of Flanders for Women
 8th Tour de Berne
9th Overall Giro d'Italia Femminile
 10th Overall Iurreta-Emakumeen Bira
2010
 7th Overall Thüringen Rundfahrt der Frauen
2011
 5th Ronde van Gelderland
2012
 2nd Novilon Euregio Cup
 3rd Road race, National Road Championships
2013
 Tour Languedoc Roussillon
1st Points classification
1st Stage 2
 Tour of Chongming Island
6th Overall Stage race
7th World Cup
2015
 1st Stage 1 Giro della Toscana Int. Femminile – Memorial Michela Fanini
 4th SwissEver GP Cham-Hagendorn
 7th Sparkassen Giro
2016
 1st  Overall Giro della Campania in Rosa
1st Stages 1, 2 & 3
 1st Omloop van het Hageland
 1st Gran Premio della Liberazione
 Trophée d'Or Féminin
1st  Points classification
1st Stages 2 & 4
 2nd Grand Prix de Dottignies
 3rd Madrid Challenge by La Vuelta
 5th Road race, UCI Road World Championships
 5th Ronde van Drenthe
 5th Women's Tour de Yorkshire
 8th Overall Belgium Tour
2017
 1st Gran Premio della Liberazione
 1st Gran Premio Bruno Beghelli Internazionale Donne Elite
 1st Stage 1 Emakumeen Euskal Bira
 1st Stage 9 Giro d'Italia Femminile
 4th Gent–Wevelgem
 7th Crescent Vårgårda UCI Women's WorldTour
 9th Overall Setmana Ciclista Valenciana
2018
 1st  Road race, UEC European Road Championships
 1st Gent–Wevelgem
 1st Grand Prix de Dottignies
 1st Brabantse Pijl Dames Gooik
 1st Trofee Maarten Wynants
 1st Gold Trophy in Euro-Women's Bike Race
 1st Stage 3 BeNe Ladies Tour
 1st Stage 1 Giro della Toscana Int. Femminile – Memorial Michela Fanini
 2nd Gran Premio Bruno Beghelli Internazionale Donne Elite
 4th Road race, National Road Championships
 4th Women's WorldTour Ronde van Drenthe
 10th Overall Setmana Ciclista Valenciana
1st Stage 2
2019
 1st  Road race, National Road Championships
 1st  Overall Gracia–Orlová
1st  Points classification
1st  Mountains classification
1st  Active rider classification
1st Stages 1 & 3
 1st Omloop van het Hageland
 1st Ronde van Drenthe
 1st Tour of Flanders for Women
 1st Postnord UCI WWT Vårgårda West Sweden
 1st Gran Premio Bruno Beghelli Internazionale Donne Elite
 1st Stage 2 Thüringen Rundfahrt der Frauen
 1st Stage 5 Tour Cycliste Féminin International de l'Ardèche
 2nd Omloop Het Nieuwsblad
 2nd Dwars door Vlaanderen for Women
 3rd Drentse Acht van Westerveld
 4th Strade Bianche Women
 4th Gent–Wevelgem
 7th Road race, UCI Road World Championships
 7th Overall Ladies Tour of Norway
 7th Three Days of Bruges–De Panne
 8th Le Samyn des Dames
 8th Amstel Gold Race
2020
 1st Vuelta a la Comunitat Valenciana Feminas
 2nd Omloop Het Nieuwsblad
 2nd Omloop van het Hageland
 4th GP de Plouay
 7th Clasica Femenina Navarra
 10th Strade Bianche Women
2021
 1st La Périgord Ladies
 1st Stage 2 Tour de Suisse
 1st Stage 5 Tour Cycliste Féminin International de l'Ardèche
 1st Stage 1 The Women's Tour
 2nd La Picto–Charentaise
 5th Gent–Wevelgem
 5th Paris–Roubaix
 6th Omloop Het Nieuwsblad
 8th Diamond Tour
 9th Overall Holland Ladies Tour
 9th Nokere Koerse
2022
 1st  Overall Grand Prix Elsy Jacobs
1st  Points classification
1st Stage 1
 1st Vuelta a la Comunitat Valenciana Feminas
 1st Omloop van het Hageland
 1st Stage 4 Setmana Ciclista Valenciana
 Bretagne Ladies Tour
1st Stages 1 & 2
 3rd Nokere Koerse
 3rd Classic Brugge–De Panne
 5th Ronde van Drenthe
 5th Dwars door Vlaanderen
 6th Gent–Wevelgem
 6th Overall RideLondon Classique 
 9th Omloop Het Nieuwsblad
 10th Tour of Flanders
2023
1st Le Samyn des Dames

Classics results timeline

See also
List of doping cases in cycling

References

External links

 
 
 
 
 
 
 
 

1987 births
Living people
People from Velletri
Italian female cyclists
Cyclists of Fiamme Azzurre
UCI Road World Champions (women)
Cyclists from Lazio
European Championships (multi-sport event) gold medalists
Olympic cyclists of Italy
Cyclists at the 2020 Summer Olympics
Sportspeople from the Metropolitan City of Rome Capital